Sahlabad (also Romanized as Sahlābād; also known as Sālehābād) is a village in Khir Rural District, Runiz District, Estahban County, Fars Province, Iran. At the 2006 census, its population was 1,908, in 444 families.

References 

Populated places in Estahban County